Sarra Guezguez (born 12 March 2005) is a Tunisian sailor. She competed in the 49er FX event at the 2020 Summer Olympics, along with her twin sister Eya. Eya died on 10 April 2022 after they were involved in a boat accident.

References

External links
 

2005 births
Living people
Tunisian female sailors (sport)
Olympic sailors of Tunisia
Sailors at the 2020 Summer Olympics – 49er FX
Place of birth missing (living people)
Twin sportspeople
Tunisian twins
People from Sousse Governorate
21st-century Tunisian women